Yingzhong is a metro station on Line 7 of the Hangzhou Metro in China. It was opened on 30 December 2020, together with the Line 7. It is located in the Xiaoshan District of Hangzhou.

References 

Hangzhou Metro stations